The Walt Disney World Railroad (WDWRR) is a 3-foot narrow-gauge heritage railroad and attraction located within the Magic Kingdom theme park of Walt Disney World in Bay Lake, Florida, in the United States. The rail line, constructed by WED Enterprises, operates with four historic steam locomotives originally built by Baldwin Locomotive Works. It takes about 20 minutes for each train to complete a round trip on the WDWRR's main line loop. On a typical day, the railroad has two trains in operation; on busy days, it has three trains.

The WDWRR's development was led by Roger E. Broggie, who also oversaw the construction of the Disneyland Railroad in Disneyland in Anaheim, California. The attraction's locomotives were acquired from the Ferrocarriles Unidos de Yucatán, a narrow-gauge railroad system in Mexico. After being shipped to the United States, they were altered to resemble locomotives built in the 1880s and restored to operating condition. Each locomotive was also given a set of passenger cars, which were built from scratch.

The WDWRR opened to the public for the first time on October 1, 1971, the same day that the Magic Kingdom park opened. Since then, the WDWRR has become one of the world's most popular steam-powered railroads, with about 3.7 million passengers each year.

History

Discovery in Mexico

The development of the Walt Disney World Railroad (WDWRR) from the late 1960s to its opening in 1971 was overseen by Roger E. Broggie, vice president and general manager of Mapo, Inc., WED Enterprises' research and manufacturing branch. Broggie previously supervised the building of the Disneyland Railroad in Disneyland in Anaheim, California. From his experience with the railroad at Disneyland, Broggie determined that it was better to use existing steam locomotives, rather than building them entirely from scratch like the Disneyland Railroad's first two locomotives. 

In 1968, he contacted rail historian Gerald M. Best who recently wrote Mexican Narrow Gauge, a book containing information about locomotives that could be obtained from a railroad boneyard in Mérida, Yucatán, Mexico, owned by the Ferrocarriles Unidos de Yucatán. This was a  narrow-gauge system, the same gauge as the Disneyland Railroad. 

In 1969, Broggie, along with fellow Disney employee and railroad-building expert Earl Vilmer, went to Mérida to investigate. They determined that four locomotives built by Baldwin Locomotive Works could potentially be salvaged, along with a fifth locomotive built by Pittsburgh Locomotive and Car Works, which was on display in front of the railroad company's headquarters. Broggie paid a total of US$32,750 for all five locomotives ($8,000 for each of the four locomotives in the boneyard plus an additional $750 for the fifth locomotive). The locomotives, along with an assortment of brass fittings and other spare parts given away for free, were immediately shipped by rail back to the United States.

Restoration in Florida

The five locomotives and spare parts acquired by Roger Broggie were sent to the Tampa Ship Repair & Dry Dock Company in Tampa, Florida, to receive the aesthetic and mechanical restorations necessary to run on the planned WDWRR. At the time, this was the closest facility to the Walt Disney World site in Bay Lake, Florida with the space and equipment needed to accommodate full-size railroad rolling stock. Here, Transportation Superintendent Earl Vilmer, who had accompanied Broggie on his trip to Mexico, along with Project Engineer Bob Harpur and the facility's Machinist Supervisor George Britton, were tasked with the project's completion.

The general idea for the restoration was to make the locomotives appear as if they were built in the 1880s. This would included new diamond smokestacks and square headlamps. The original, dilapidated boilers of the four locomotives built by Baldwin Locomotive Works were replaced with new, smaller boilers built by Dixon Boiler Works. Their worn-out wood and steel cabs were replaced with new ones made of fiberglass, and they were given new tenders, which used the trucks from the originals. Many of the smaller original parts on the locomotives such as the domes and brass bells on top of the boilers, the frames, the wheels, and the side rods were successfully refurbished and retained. The locomotives' fireboxes were also modified to burn diesel oil. Replicas of their builder's plates were also made to replace the originals. The restoration cost for the four Baldwin locomotives and their tenders was around $125,000 each.

The Pittsburgh Locomotive and Car Works locomotive acquired along with them could not be restored. Built in 1902, this locomotive was the oldest of the five locomotives purchased and was determined to have too many problems to be rebuilt. Some of its parts were salvaged to help restore the four Baldwin locomotives, including its smokestack, which was fitted to the WDWRR's No. 4 locomotive. Afterwards, the remains of the Pittsburgh Locomotive and Car Works locomotive were stored out of use at WED Enterprises in Glendale, California before being sold to an unknown locomotive broker in the mid 1980s.

Opening to present day
The restoration of the WDWRR's four locomotives, as well as the construction of five new open-air Narragansett-style excursion cars for each of them (twenty in total), was completed in less than two years. The first completed set of five passenger cars was delivered to the Magic Kingdom park during April 1971 and the first completed locomotive arrived on May 15, 1971, several months before the park's opening. Like the steam trains running on the Disneyland Railroad during Disneyland's opening day on July 17, 1955, the steam trains for the WDWRR were the first attraction in the Magic Kingdom park to be finished, and they have been operating in the park ever since it opened on October 1, 1971. D tickets were required to ride on the WDWRR until 1982 when they were discontinued in favor of the pay-one-price admission system, allowing visitors to experience all of the park's attractions, including the WDWRR. George Britton, who was instrumental in getting the WDWRR's locomotives refurbished, became the railroad's foreman from the time the railroad opened until his retirement on April 6, 2006. He would later pass away on October 10, 2022. The WDWRR would eventually become one of the most popular steam-powered railroads in the world with about 3.7 million passengers each year.

For the first few months after the WDWRR opened to the public, Main Street, U.S.A. Station at the Magic Kingdom park's entrance, modeled after the former Victorian-style Saratoga Springs station in Saratoga Springs, New York, was the only stop for passengers along its route, making only complete round trips possible. On May 1, 1972, the first Frontierland Station opened near the Pecos Bill Tall Tale Inn and Café in the Frontierland section on the park's western edge. It was one of the last changes made to the WDWRR prior to the retirement of Roger Broggie on October 1, 1973. Frontierland Station was demolished in November 1990 to make way for the new Splash Mountain log flume attraction and was replaced by the current Frontierland Station, which opened in December 1991 between the Splash Mountain and Big Thunder Mountain Railroad attractions. During construction of the Splash Mountain attraction and the current Frontierland Station, the WDWRR was temporarily renamed Backtrack Express and operated a single train in a shuttle mode along the section of track between the Main Street, U.S.A. and Mickey's Starland sections. Additionally, the original water tower in the Frontierland section was removed and the current one was built in the Mickey's Starland section. Between 1976 and 1977, the Auto-Train Corporation sponsored the WDWRR.

The WDWRR's third station, Mickey's Birthdayland Station, opened on June 18, 1988, in the Magic Kingdom park's brand-new Mickey's Birthdayland section adjacent to the Fantasyland section in the park's northeast corner, and the railroad was briefly renamed Mickey's Birthdayland Express to promote it. When the Mickey's Birthdayland section was renamed Mickey's Starland in 1990, Mickey's Toyland in late 1995, and Mickey's Toontown Fair in 1996, the signage for its WDWRR station changed both times, but the station's structure remained the same. In mid 2004, the station was demolished and completely rebuilt with a much shorter canopy. On February 11, 2011, the Mickey's Toontown Fair section closed to make way for the new Storybook Circus area, part of a new expansion of the Fantasyland section. The current Fantasyland Station, built on the site of the former Mickey's Toontown Fair Station, opened on March 12, 2012. The new station's area was nicknamed Carolwood Park, paying tribute to Walt Disney's Carolwood Pacific Railroad. In April 2012, the water tower and maintenance buildings adjacent to Fantasyland Station were re-themed to match the station's new design. These were the last additions made to the WDWRR before the death of Bob Harpur in November 2012.

On December 3, 2018, the WDWRR temporarily closed to accommodate construction of the TRON Lightcycle / Run roller coaster attraction in the Tomorrowland section. On December 23, 2022, the WDWRR reopened with a new tunnel adjacent to the TRON attraction. Additionally, many of the wooden railroad ties along the route were replaced with composite plastic ties for another 25 years of track maintenance. The stations in the Main Street, U.S.A. and Frontierland sections were repainted with new colors. The water tower at Fantasyland Station was completely refurbished. During a media preview for the attraction's reopening the previous day, the Magic Kingdom employees were offered to board the new WDWRR ride experience. On January 23, 2023, the Splash Mountain attraction containing one of the WDWRR's tunnels permanently closed to be rethemed as the new Tiana's Bayou Adventure ride.

Ride experience

Beginning at Main Street, U.S.A. Station adjacent to the Magic Kingdom park's entrance, the trains of the WDWRR travel along its single track in a clockwise direction on its circular route, which spans  around the park. It takes about 20 minutes for each train to complete a round trip on the WDWRR's main line and each of them arrives at each station every 4-10 minutes. On any given day, either two or three trains run, with two running on a typical day and three on a busy day, depending on the number of park guests. While passengers are waiting at Main Street, U.S.A. Station for the next train, they are able to observe the mutoscopes, medallions, and arcade machines in the waiting area.

As the train departs Main Street, U.S.A. Station, it passes the Magic Kingdom monorail station, crosses an access road in the Adventureland section, travels over a small bridge, enters a small tunnel, and crosses a second access road in the Frontierland section. After entering a tunnel through the now defunct Splash Mountain log flume attraction, the train stops at Frontierland Station. While the train is awaiting to depart, a sound effect of a telegraph operator using a telegraph key to enter Morse code can be heard at the station, transmitting Walt Disney's 1955 Disneyland dedication speech.

Continuing down the line, the train passes the Big Thunder Mountain Railroad mine train roller coaster attraction and traverses a fully functional swing bridge, which crosses a canal connecting the Rivers of America to a dry dock area and the Seven Seas Lagoon. This bridge was originally located in Wabasso, Florida, and was previously owned by the Florida East Coast Railway. The train then runs through the park's northern area where numerous static and Audio-Animatronic displays of Native Americans and wild animals can be seen. Occasionally, live alligators and deer can be seen in this vicinity. Additionally, the Liberty Belle Riverboat can be seen in the Rivers of America, often floating side by side with the train and sounding their whistles at each other. Afterwards, the train goes under an overpass, passes the spur line leading to the WDWRR's roundhouse where its trains are stored and maintained, and arrives at its next stop at Fantasyland Station. While the train is stopped at this station, where the railroad's water tower is used to refill the tender if needed, the train crew will perform a boiler blowdown and maintenance service on the locomotive.

In the final segment of the train's journey around the park, it goes through a two-percent grade tunnel adjacent to the TRON Lightcycle / Run roller coaster attraction. Afterwards, the train passes the Space Mountain roller coaster attraction in the Tomorrowland section, and travels over a small bridge before it arrives back at Main Street, U.S.A. Station. This completes what the park refers to as The Grand Circle Tour.

The WDWRR closes temporarily during heavy thunderstorms. During the Magic Kingdom Parade events, the trains are halted for approximately 15 minutes due to parade floats crossing over the WDWRR tracks in the Frontierland section. Personal strollers and wheelchairs were allowed on board the train, excluding rental Disney strollers and electric conveyance vehicles. All of the stations had disability ramps access for the wheelchair passengers to board the train. Since August 1999, a separately-priced tour of the WDWRR named Disney's The Magic Behind Our Steam Trains Tour has been available once on Sundays-Thursdays, and includes access to the railroad's otherwise-restricted roundhouse. At the end of the tour, the guests were originally given free railroad spikes as souvenirs, but due to the September 11 attacks in 2001, the spikes were dropped in favor of the enamel pins. In 2020, the tour became unavailable due to the COVID-19 pandemic.

Rolling stock

Each of the four locomotives takes on water at Fantasyland Station every three trips and pulls a set of five passenger cars with seating capacity for 75 passengers per car, for a total of 375 passengers per train. The front passenger car had a disability ramp for the two wheelchair passengers to be loaded on. Occasionally, locomotives and their passenger car sets will be switched when either one is out of service. The locomotives do not contain brakes, but the passenger cars do. On March 1, 1997, another locomotive arrived at Walt Disney World and was named after former Disney animator and rail enthusiast Ward Kimball, but was deemed too small for the WDWRR's operations and was instead sent to the Cedar Point & Lake Erie Railroad in the Cedar Point amusement park in Sandusky, Ohio. In the past, all four locomotives received overhauls at the Tweetsie Railroad in Blowing Rock, North Carolina. Since 2010, overhauling services have taken place at the Strasburg Rail Road in Strasburg, Pennsylvania.

Daily operation

The WDWRR is operated by Main Street Operations, which also operates an antique double-decker bus, a jitney, a fire engine, and a horse-drawn street trolley in the Main Street, U.S.A. section. Early in the morning at 5:30 A.M., the first train crew arrives at the WDWRR's roundhouse to get the first train ready to run for the day's operations. Each train is run by an engineer and fireman in the locomotive, as well as a conductor at the rear of the train who supervises the passengers and ensures that the passenger cars' equipment is working. Since the locomotive needs steam pressure to operate, an air compressor hose needs to be connected to the locomotive to run the stack blower and atomizer valves for the fireman firing up the locomotive every 45 minutes. Once the locomotive is fired up, the train leaves the roundhouse and stops in front of a railroad crossing while the train crew performs the safety valve test on the locomotive. Afterwards, the train moves to a small bridge where the train crew performs a boiler blowdown on the locomotive. Once the train enters the Magic Kingdom park starting at Fantasyland Station, the last safety check is performed where the train runs past a red light to test the passenger cars' automatic brakes. 

When the Magic Kingdom park opens, the trains arrive at each station with the fireman ringing the locomotive's bell to let the passengers know that the trains are ready for boarding. Each time a train completes two trips around the park, the fireman will take the engineer's position with the latter taking a break and a new fireman taking the former's position every 40 minutes at Main Street, U.S.A. Station. Meanwhile, the train conductor at each train swapped positions with the station conductor at each station every 20 minutes. It usually takes about two and a half minutes to get some of the passengers off and more passengers on the train at each station. The conductor sounds a buzzer horn in the locomotive's cab to let the engineer know if the train is ready to depart or if an emergency stop is needed. Occasionally, before the train departs at each station, the conductor will let more than one child become a Guest Conductor, where they say "All aboard!" through the conductor's microphone and given a free Guest Conductor souvenir card.

When the WDWRR closes each night during the fireworks show, due to its track running close to the fireworks staging area, the trains unload the last passengers at Fantasyland Station, and the conductor would throw the switch to let the trains run in reverse along the spur line leading back to the WDWRR's roundhouse. Once the trains are back inside the roundhouse, the machine shop crew gives them a thorough inspection and performs repairs if needed. After midnight, the locomotives' tenders get replenished with diesel oil. The roundhouse stores the WDWRR's locomotives and passenger cars on the lower level, while the upper level houses the storage and maintenance facility for the Walt Disney World monorails.

Block signals

The WDWRR uses block signals to notify the engineers, firemen, and conductors on each train whether the track segments along the railroad's  of main-line track are clear or occupied by other trains. They are also used to notify WDWRR personnel when Big Thunder Mountain Railroad's transfer track is swung over the WDWRR's track to transfer trains on and off the roller coaster. The WDWRR's track is divided into seven such segments, or blocks, and each block has a track-side block signal to communicate its status. Block signals are located at each of the three stations, alongside the three main-line blocks between the stations, and alongside the spur line connecting the WDWRR's roundhouse to the main line.

See also
Hogwarts Express (Universal Orlando Resort)
Rail transport in Walt Disney Parks and Resorts
Serengeti Express
Sugar Express
TECO Line Streetcar

References

Bibliography

External links

1971 establishments in Florida
3 ft gauge railways in the United States
Fantasyland
Frontierland
Heritage railroads in Florida
Magic Kingdom
Main Street, U.S.A.
Narrow gauge railroads in Florida
Passenger rail transportation in Florida
Rail transport in Walt Disney Parks and Resorts
Railroads of amusement parks in the United States
Railway lines opened in 1971
Transportation in Orange County, Florida
Walt Disney Parks and Resorts attractions
Walt Disney World transit